Austin Dean Maddox (born May 13, 1991) is an American former professional baseball pitcher. He had previously played for the Boston Red Sox of Major League Baseball.

Early years
Maddox graduated from high school in 2009 as the top catcher in the state of Florida, having batted .544 in his senior year. He was drafted by the Tampa Bay Rays in the 37th round of the 2009 MLB Draft, but he did not sign. Instead, he played college baseball at the University of Florida, where he was teammates with future MLB catcher Mike Zunino. Initially a catcher and infielder, Maddox batted .303 in his three seasons with the Gators (2010–2012). In 2011 and 2012, he made a total of 53 appearances as a pitcher, striking out 78 and walking 14 in  innings, while compiling a 1.86 earned run average (ERA).

Professional career
Maddox was drafted by the Boston Red Sox in the third round of the 2012 MLB Draft, and signed with the team in June 2012.

From 2012 through 2015, Maddox played in the lower levels of Boston's farm system; the Rookie League Gulf Coast League Red Sox, the Class A Short Season Lowell Spinners, the Class A Greenville Drive, and the Class A-Advanced Salem Red Sox. During 2016, he was promoted to the Double-A Portland Sea Dogs and then the Triple-A Pawtucket Red Sox. In 2017, he again played in Portland and Pawtucket, and was called up to the majors for the first time on June 15.

During six year in the minors, 2012 through 2017, Maddox appeared in 143 games, pitching  innings with a 13–18 record, 4.27 ERA, and 1.282 WHIP, while recording 227 strikeouts, 83 walks, and 25 saves.

Maddox made his MLB debut on June 17, 2017, pitching the seventh inning in a Red Sox loss to the Houston Astros; he retired the side without allowing a baserunner. He appeared in one more game in June, one game in July, and then ten games during September. He finished the regular season with 13 appearances for the 2017 Red Sox, allowing just one earned run in  innings pitched (0.52 ERA), with 14 strikeouts and two walks. Maddox was included on Boston's postseason roster for the 2017 American League Division Series. He made two one-inning appearances against the Houston Astros, allowing one earned run (4.50 ERA), with two strikeouts and two walks, as the Red Sox lost to the eventual World Series champions.

Due to shoulder inflammation during spring training, Maddox began the 2018 season on the disabled list. He was sent on rehabilitation assignments with Triple-A Pawtucket on May 18, Double-A Portland on May 30, and Pawtucket again on June 2. On July 8, he was transferred to the 60-day disabled list. On August 16, Maddox was sent on a rehabilitation assignment with the Gulf Coast League Red Sox, and on August 24 with Triple-A Pawtucket. On September 19, Maddox had surgery on his right rotator cuff with what was described as a right shoulder strain; he did not play in any MLB games during 2018. After the season, the Red Sox sent Maddox outright to Pawtucket, removing him from their 40-man roster.

Maddox spent the 2019 season on the injured list with Pawtucket. Maddox was released by the Red Sox on October 25, 2019. On February 28, 2020, Maddox announced his retirement from professional baseball.

References

External links

, or Retrosheet

1991 births
Living people
Baseball players from Jacksonville, Florida
Major League Baseball pitchers
Boston Red Sox players
Florida Gators baseball players
Gulf Coast Red Sox players
Lowell Spinners players
Greenville Drive players
Salem Red Sox players
Portland Sea Dogs players
Pawtucket Red Sox players
Águilas del Zulia players